Florence–Darlington Technical College is a public community college in Florence, South Carolina. It is a part of the South Carolina Technical College System.

The Florence-Darlington Technical Education Center was established in 1963 and serves Florence, Darlington, and Marion counties. The college's initial enrollment of 250 students now exceeds 6,000 students.

The college operates sites in Hartsville, Lake City, and Mullins. The college also operates a large health sciences complex in downtown Florence entirely devoted to careers in the health arena.

External links

Buildings and structures in Florence, South Carolina
Universities and colleges accredited by the Southern Association of Colleges and Schools
Educational institutions established in 1963
Education in Florence County, South Carolina
Education in Darlington County, South Carolina
Education in Marion County, South Carolina
South Carolina Technical College System
1963 establishments in South Carolina